Edwin F. Leonard (July 15, 1862 – November 1931) was an American druggist and  politician who served in the Massachusetts House of Representatives and as the 37th Mayor of Springfield, Massachusetts.

Trivia

In 1907, while he was in Massachusetts House of Representatives, Leonard served on the House Committee on Mercantile Affairs with future president Calvin Coolidge.

Notes

1862 births
1931 deaths
People from Belmont, New Hampshire
Springfield, Massachusetts City Council members
Mayors of Springfield, Massachusetts
Republican Party members of the Massachusetts House of Representatives